Dereck Darkwa (born 3 April 2000) is a Dutch footballer of Ghanaian descent. He most recently played for Jong NEC.

Club career
He made his Eerste Divisie debut for Jong FC Utrecht on 9 November 2018 in a game against Sparta Rotterdam, as a 73rd-minute substitute for Mehdi Lehaire. Darkwa left the club on 26 March 2019, when his contract was terminated by mutual consent. In September 2019, he joined Jong NEC but left the club after a few months. After becoming a free agent, he trialled with an unnamed English club, but this did not amount to a contract.

References

External links
 

2000 births
Footballers from Amsterdam
Dutch sportspeople of Ghanaian descent
Living people
Dutch footballers
Netherlands youth international footballers
Association football forwards
Jong FC Utrecht players
Eerste Divisie players